Naval Enna Jewel is a  2017 Indian Malayalam-language drama film co-written, co-produced and directed by Renji Lal Damodaran. The film revolves around the lives of a mother and daughter who were the victims of an Arabi kalyanam. The film stars Reem Kadem in titular role, where Shweta Menon, Anu Sithara, Adil Hussain, Alen Matters, Anjali Nair, Sudheer Karamana and Paris Laxmi portray supporting roles.

Naval Enna Jewel released on 18 August 2017 and received mixed response from critics while Shwetha Menon's performance got praises.

Plot 
Asma is the eldest daughter in a poor Muslim family in Malabar. Asma is married to a 70-year-old Iranian as his fifth wife. Soon the Iranian dies and Asma becomes a widow with one child. But Asma's daughter Naval gets good education and grew into a progressive woman. Her guardian, Chachu made all this possible. And one day Naval had to kill a man for attempting rape. Naval gets a death sentence for the same. Then it is revealed that Chachu is not a man but Asma. Then the film follows Asma's attempts to help Naval.

Cast 
 Reem Kadem as Naval Al Ameer
 Shwetha Menon as Asma and Chachu
 Anu Sithara 
 Adil Hussain as  Murshthak Hussain 
 Alen Matters as Aslam
 Anjali Aneesh as Reena Mathews
 Renny Johnson as Hussain Babba
 Sudheer Karamana
 Paris Laxmi
 Manikandan Pattambi
 Chinnu Korah as Teacher

Soundtrack 
The film soundtrack consist of three Malayalam songs and one English song. Music of Malayalam songs was composed by M Jayachandran, with lyrics by Rafeeq Ahammed and Kavyamayi Renji Lal. The fourth song is by Eddie Torres and Ashley Garland.

Critical response 
Naval Enna Jewel received mixed reviews generally. Meera Manu of Deccan Chronicle described the film as fight against patriarchy. And she is given 3.5 ratings out of five. Asha Praksh of The Times of India wrote that beside a serious theme, the film lacks a consistency of story telling.

References

External links 
 
 Official Facebook Page

2017 films
2010s Malayalam-language films
Indian drama films
Films shot in Kannur
Films shot in Thalassery
Films shot in Kozhikode
Films set in Iran
2017 drama films